Obaidul Huq (31 October 1911 – 13 October 2007) was a Bangladeshi journalist, cinematographer, playwright and writer.
 He was awarded Ekushey Padak in 1981 by the Government of Bangladesh.

Early life and education 
Huq was born to Bazlul Huq Khan and Anjuman Nessa on 31 October 1911 at Feni in  Noakhali. His father was a lawyer at Feni and a Member of the Bengal Provincial Legislative Assembly. Huq did his master's degree in philosophy and psychology in 1934 and obtained a law degree in 1936 from the University of Dhaka.

Career 
Huq joined the Pakistan Observer in 1951 as joint editor and after the independence of Bangladesh in 1971 he joined The Bangladesh Observer as the editor. Later, he worked as a columnist and regular contributor to different dailies.

Personal life
Huq had four sons, Mashuqul Huq , Arham Masudul Huq. Anjam Maruf, Sazzad Zabir; three daughters Salma Ahsan, Asma Huq and Naima Huq. Syeda Rumana Tahmin, Syeda Rumana Tasleem, Syeda Rumana Tasneem, Syed Jamil Ahsan, Imran Asif, Asfia Farheen Huq Toma, Sadia Farzana, Samia Farzana, Nafisul Huq, Rafida Maruf Choity, Fasiha Zabir and Shoily are among his grand children.

Filmography

Awards 
 Bangla Academy Literary Award (1964)
 Ekushey Padak (1981)
 UNICEF Gold Medal (1983)
 Abdus Salam Gold Medal
 Zahur Hossain Gold Medal
 Kazi Mahbubullah and Begum Zebunnessa Trust Gold Medal
 Atisha Dipankar prize
 Millenium Award (2002)
 Hiralal Sen prize (2003)

References

Further reading 
 

1911 births
2007 deaths
People from Feni District
University of Dhaka alumni
Bangladeshi journalists
Bangladeshi male writers
Bangladeshi film directors
Bengali film directors
Recipients of the Ekushey Padak
Recipients of Bangla Academy Award
20th-century journalists
Bangladesh Krishak Sramik Awami League central committee members